This is a list of airports in Transnistria, sorted by location.



Airport 

Currently, no airport in Transnistria has scheduled passenger service on commercial airlines.

See also 
 Transport in Moldova
 List of airports by ICAO code: L#LU – Moldova
 Wikipedia:WikiProject Aviation/Airline destination lists: Europe#Moldova, Republic of

References 

 
 
  – includes IATA codes
  – IATA codes, ICAO codes and coordinates

 
Airports in Moldova